Elachista lopadina is a moth of the family Elachistidae. It is found in south-western Western Australia.

The wingspan is about 7 mm for males. The forewings are whitish, mottled by pale brownish grey-tipped scales.

References

Moths described in 2011
lopadina
Moths of Australia